Games played (most often abbreviated as G or GP) is a statistic used in team sports to indicate the total number of games in which a player has participated (in any capacity); the statistic is generally applied irrespective of whatever portion of the game is contested. In baseball, the statistic applies also to players who, prior to a game, are included on a starting lineup card or are announced as ex ante substitutes, whether or not they play; however, in Major League Baseball, the application of this statistic does not extend to consecutive games played streaks. A starting pitcher, then, may be credited with a game played even if he is not credited with a game started or an inning pitched. The center fielder (CF) is one of the three outfielders, the defensive positions in baseball farthest from the batter. Center field is the area of the outfield directly in front of a person standing at home plate and facing beyond the pitcher's mound. The outfielders' duty is to try to catch long fly balls before they hit the ground or to quickly catch or retrieve and return to the infield any other balls entering the outfield. Generally having the most territory to cover, the center fielder is usually the fastest of the three outfielders, although this can also depend on the relative strength of their throwing arms and the configuration of their home field, due to the deepest part of center field being the farthest point from the infield and home plate. The center fielder normally plays behind the shortstop and second baseman, who play in or near the infield; unlike catchers and most infielders (excepting first basemen), who are virtually exclusively right-handed, center fielders can be either right- or left-handed. In the scoring system used to record defensive plays, the center fielder is assigned the number 8.

Because game accounts and box scores often did not distinguish between the outfield positions, there has been some difficulty in determining precise defensive statistics prior to 1901; because of this, and because of the similarity in their roles, defensive statistics for the three positions are frequently combined. However, efforts to distinguish between the three positions regarding games played during this period and reconstruct the separate totals have been largely successful; players whose totals include pre-1901 games are notated in the table below. Willie Mays is all-time leader in games played as a center fielder with 2,829 games played in his career. Tris Speaker (2,691), Steve Finley (2,314), Willie Davis (2,239), Ty Cobb (2,194), Ken Griffey Jr. (2,145), and Doc Cramer (2,027) are the only other players to appear in over 2,000 games in center field in their careers.

Key

List

Stats updated through the 2022 season

Other Hall of Famers

Notes

References

External links

Major League Baseball statistics
Games played as a left fielder